Trophy Mountain (locally called Trophy Mountains or The Trophies) is a mountain in east-central British Columbia, Canada, located in the south-east region of Wells Gray Provincial Park. The Clearwater River flows to the west, Raft River to the east and Spahats Creek to the south. Trophy Mountain is part of the Shuswap Highland. Battle Mountain and Table Mountain are the closest summits to the north and Raft Mountain is immediately south. Trophy Mountain was given its name by Dan Case, a big-game hunting guide in the area.

Trophy Mountain is easily accessible by road and trail. It is a popular summer tourist attraction and is especially noted for colourful alpine meadows. Numerous hiking routes are possible beyond the end of the trail at Sheila Lake.

Access
The gravel road is steep and rough, and usable by all vehicles except those with very low clearance.

A well-used trail starts here and climbs  through a band of trees to the alpine meadows. The leisurely hike of  takes about 75 minutes to reach an abandoned shepherd's hut. During the last 30 minutes, there are views of the north face of Raft Mountain across Spahats Creek Valley to the south. This section of the meadows has colourful flower displays in late July and early August, as well as an earlier bloom of glacier lilies in late June. The trail continues past the hut for 30 minutes to the Sheila Lake Lookout. This viewpoint encompasses Sheila Lake to the north, Plateau of Lakes with numerous tarns to the northeast, and four of the nine Trophy summits beyond that. Raft Mountain and the spire of Dunn Peak are to the south.

A few primitive campsites and an outhouse are located near Sheila Lake for the benefit of backpackers. The trail ends at Sheila Lake and hikers who want to go further can walk across the meadows. The hiking season on Trophy Mountain is from late June through September.

History

The shepherd's hut was built by brothers John and Frank Ronacher in the 1950s when they herded sheep on the Trophy meadows. At that time, the access was via a rough trail up Third Canyon which the Ronachers widened with a bulldozer. Frank died in 1962 and later that year John sold the Trophy grazing lease and 100 ewes and rams to Emil and Ida DeKelver. They arrived in the Clearwater Valley in 1959 and settled on an 80-acre farm beside Candle Creek. At first, the DeKelvers raised dairy cattle then, after purchasing the Ronacher business, were busy with their sheep. Soon they had expanded the herd to 300 and were very successful with the lush Trophy grasslands. In 1969, mounting government pressure against grazing lease-holders persuaded the DeKelvers to switch to guiding and trail-riding on the Trophy Mountains. They built a new trail up Spahats Creek which was much shorter than the Third Canyon route, although strenuous compared to today's stroll to the meadows. When logging started on the Trophy Mountains in 1979 and roads were built almost to treeline, the DeKelvers’ business was ruined and they retired to their Candle Creek farm. Ida spent many years collecting historic artifacts from the Clearwater Valley and developing the Yellowhead Museum which is now closed. Meanwhile, high on Trophy Mountain, the shepherd's hut is being ravaged by the alpine weather and soon there will be no evidence of the days when these meadows were home to hundreds of sheep.

The south boundary of Wells Gray Park was originally established in 1939 through Grouse Creek Valley just north of Trophy Mountain. In 1997, the park was expanded to include the mountain above its treeline.

Geology
Most of the rock comprising Trophy Mountain is part of the ancient Shuswap Metamorphic Complex which arches across the British Columbia Interior in a wide band from Shuswap Lake to Adams Lake and into the Quesnel Highland. No age has been established, but it was intruded by the Raft Batholith about 100 million years ago.

Much of the lava which accumulated in the Clearwater Valley near Spahats Creek was spewed out from fissures on the west side of Trophy Mountain between 500,000 and 300,000 years ago. Evidence of a more recent volcanic era is seen in the Buck Hill cinder cone at the  level of Trophy Mountain and in what is possibly a water-filled volcanic crater at the headwaters of Third Canyon Creek.

Wells Gray Park's southernmost glacier is on the north side of Trophy Mountain and can be seen from the West Summit.

Hikes and climbs
Detailed descriptions of these hikes and starting points are in Exploring Wells Gray Park (6th edition) and Nature Wells Gray (2nd edition). 
 Long Hill – westernmost summit, elevation . About two hours one-way from Sheila Lake. 
 West Summit – elevation . About two hours one-way from Sheila Lake via Lake of the Rock. Garnet Peak, third highest in Wells Gray Park, and Mount Robson, highest in the Canadian Rockies, can be seen from here.  
 Trophy Skyline – This is a rewarding hike with panoramic views that connects West Summit and Long Hill. About five hours round trip from Sheila Lake. 
 Trophy Summit – This rigorous hike takes 12 hours round trip from the parking lot or 9 hours from Sheila Lake. The route is via West Summit then the narrow West Ridge with scrambling to the main summit. An alternate return route is via Cwem Cwem Lake and Silvertip Creek. 
 East Ridges – The driving access is via Spahats Creek Valley to the pass. The unsigned trail takes about two hours to the meadows. A longer hike goes to the East Summits and Wolverine Basin, and takes about six hours return.

References

External links
Wells Gray Provincial Park official government website

Two-thousanders of British Columbia
Wells Gray-Clearwater
Kamloops Division Yale Land District